The first World Food Conference was held in Rome in 1974 (5-16 November) by the United Nations under the auspices of the UN Food and Agriculture Organization (FAO), in the wake of the devastating famine in Bangladesh in the preceding two years. 

Perhaps the most famous statement made at the conference was by then-U.S. Secretary of State Henry Kissinger who made the declaration that within 10 years no child would go to bed hungry. 

In the Universal Declaration on the Eradication of Hunger and Malnutrition, governments attending the World Food Conference proclaimed that "every man, woman and child has the inalienable right to be free from hunger and malnutrition in order to develop their physical and mental faculties."  

Among other outcomes, the conference put in place a World Food Council (subsequently disbanded) and led to follow-up World Food Conferences.

The FAO commemorated this conference with the issue of a CERES Medal featuring Germaine Tillion.

See also
Right to food
World Food Summit

References

External links
 www.fao.org

United Nations conferences
Diplomatic conferences in Italy
20th-century diplomatic conferences
1974 in international relations
1974 in Italy
Food and Agriculture Organization